Saint John Centre was a provincial electoral district for the Legislative Assembly of New Brunswick, Canada. It was created from Saint John in 1795 as Saint John City. It was renamed Saint John Centre in 1967. 

It elected multiple members through the bloc voting system -- two members prior to 1892 and four members from 1892 to 1973.

It was abolished with the 1973 electoral redistribution, when the province moved to single-member ridings.

Members of the Legislative Assembly

Election results

Saint John Centre

Saint John City

References

Former provincial electoral districts of New Brunswick
1974 disestablishments in New Brunswick